One is a song from the musical A Chorus Line.

Production
Director Michael Bennett explained his view regarding the song's inception and placement within the show:

Synopsis
The dancers finally dance the chorus number for an unnamed and unseen star. They are all wearing uniforms so it is impossible to tell them apart. The uniqueness that made them all so interesting throughout the show has now been damaged by the reality of show business.

Critical reception
CityBeat described the song as "the show’s greatest emotional wallop". The Davis Enterprise dubbed it the show's "signature tune".
The song was covered in Sesame Street and featured in the home video 123 Count with Me.

Other media
In 1976, the Brady family performed the song in the pilot episode of The Brady Bunch Variety Hour.

On Sesame Street, it was covered by 10 Muppet numbers in a chorus line.

Catherine Zeta-Jones performed the song, with modified lyrics, in dedication to her husband Michael Douglas during the 2009 AFI Lifetime Achievement Award Ceremony.

References

Songs from A Chorus Line
1975 songs